Amduscia is a Mexican aggrotech band from Mexico City consisting of Polo Acevedo (vocals, lyrics, sampling), Raul Montelongo, and Adrian Ruiz.

History and origin of name
Amduscia was founded in 1999 in Mexico City. However in March 2010, Edgar Acevedo died due to medical complications associated with leukemia.

The group's name is derived from demon Amdusias in medieval demonology.

Style and influences
Their music has been described as aggrotech and they have cited influences from "dark ethereal, dark wave, cyberpunk, old ebm school [sic], to newer style such as synthpop and future pop."

They have been compared to Hocico and Cenobita on their early releases, but by fusing the darker style with contemporary trance music approach led them to a style of their own and to gather a growing fanbase in Mexico and Europe, mostly in Germany, appearing at festivals such as Wave-Gotik-Treffen, M'era Luna Festival and a shared European tour with Combichrist.

Recent events
In mid-2009, Amduscia had turned into a two-person project due to professional differences, with Raul Montelongo leaving to fully concentrate on his until then side-project LuciferChrist. On March 27, 2010, it was announced that Edgar “Amduscia“ Acevedo had died due to medical complications derived from leukemia, with the only remaining member being Ruiz. He decided to continue the band in legacy of Acevedo.

Discography

Releases

Remixes of other artists

Compilations

References

External links
 Amduscia's official website
 Amduscia on Myspace
 Amduscia on Vampirefreaks
 Amduscia on Last.fm
 Amduscia on Out of Line Music
 Amduscia on Metropolis Records
 
 Amduscia discography at Discogs

Electro-industrial music groups
Mexican industrial music groups
Mexican electronic musical groups
Musical groups from Mexico City
Musical groups established in 1999
Metropolis Records artists
1999 establishments in Mexico